Júlia Takács (born 29 June 1989) is a Spanish race walker. She competed in the women's 20 kilometres walk event at the 2016 Summer Olympics. Takács is Hungarian, born in Budapest. She acquired Spanish citizenship on 20 June 2008.

Competition record

References

External links
 

1989 births
Living people
Spanish female racewalkers
Athletes from Budapest
Athletes (track and field) at the 2016 Summer Olympics
Olympic athletes of Spain
Naturalised citizens of Spain
Hungarian emigrants to Spain
Universiade medalists in athletics (track and field)
Universiade gold medalists for Spain
Medalists at the 2011 Summer Universiade